Georgetown County is a county located in the U.S. state of South Carolina. As of the 2020 census, the population was 63,404. Its county seat is Georgetown. The county was founded in 1769. It is named for George III of the United Kingdom.

Georgetown County comprises the Georgetown, SC Micropolitan Statistical Area, which is also included in the Myrtle Beach–Conway, SC–NC Combined Statistical Area.

History 
The county was chartered in 1769 but only officially became a county in 1800. It is named for George III of the United Kingdom. The county seat is Georgetown while the largest community is Murrells Inlet.

Geography

Georgetown County has several rivers, including the Great Pee Dee River, the Waccamaw River, Black River, and Sampit River, all of which flow into Winyah Bay. The Santee River, which forms the southern boundary of the county, empties directly into the Atlantic. The Intracoastal Waterway crosses the county and Winyah Bay. The rivers and the bay have had a decisive effect on human development of the area, especially as the city of Georgetown has an excellent seaport and harbor.

Georgetown County is a diverse county with four distinct areas:

1. The Atlantic coastline, also called Waccamaw Neck, including the communities of Murrells Inlet, Litchfield, Pawleys Island and DeBordieu, is part of "The Grand Strand" (beach), which includes Myrtle Beach to the north. The Georgetown County part of the Grand Strand used to be rural area, but is exploding with development today. Condos line the shoreline at Litchfield and many of the old cottages at Pawleys are being demolished for larger houses. DeBordieu is a gated community.

Empty beachfront has disappeared and wild areas are rapidly vanishing. A few wilder areas are being saved, as these provide critical habitat as part of the Atlantic Flyway for migratory birds. Huntington Beach State Park preserves some of the coastline and coastal marshes in the northern section, with nearby Brookgreen Gardens preserving a historical rice plantation and some forest. Brookgreen Gardens, with a nature center and many outdoor sculptures is a popular tourist spot.

The University of South Carolina and Clemson University maintain the Belle W. Baruch research site at Hobcaw Barony on Waccamaw Neck. The islands around the outlet of Winyah Bay are designated as the "Tom Yawkey Wildlife Center Heritage Preserve". This area is home to the northernmost naturally occurring hammocks of South Carolina's signature sabal palmetto tree.

2. The riverfronts have had little recent development.  Such properties were once used for rice plantations, using a rice variety brought from Africa. After the Civil War, and the loss of slave labor, the plantations gradually ceased production. Today they are primarily wild areas, accessible only by boat.  In some areas, the earthworks, such as dikes and water gates used for rice culture, still exist, as well as a few of the plantation houses. Litchfield Plantation has been redeveloped as a country inn; other properties have been developed as planned residential communities. Great blue herons, alligators, and an occasional bald eagle can be seen along the waterways. Fishing is a popular activity.

A tiny community accessible only by boat is on Sandy Island, in the Pee Dee River. Residents are descendants of slaves who worked plantations on the island, and they are trying to keep out development. Recently the Federal government began buying land along the rivers for the new Waccamaw Wildlife Refuge, which is intended to protect such wild areas. The headquarters of the refuge will be at Yauhannah in the northern part of the county.

3. Georgetown is a small historic city founded in colonial times. It is a popular tourist area and a port for shrimp boats. Yachting "snowbirds" are often seen at the docks in spring and fall; these people follow the seasons along the Intracoastal waterway.

4. The inland rural areas are thinly populated. Some upland areas are good for agriculture or forestry. Several Carolina bays are thought to be craters from a meteor shower. These areas are rich in biodiversity.  Carvers Bay, the largest, was extensively damaged by use as a practice bombing range by US military forces during World War II.  Draining of the bay has further damaged its environment.

National protected areas
 North Inlet-Winyah Bay National Estuarine Research Reserve
 Waccamaw National Wildlife Refuge (part)

State and local protected areas/sites 
 Baruch-North Island Reserve
 Bellefield House
 Black River Cypress Preserve
 Brookgreen Gardens
 Friendfield Village
 Georgetown Historic District
 Hobcaw House
 Huntington Beach State Park
 Mansfield Plantation
 Pee Dee River Rice Planters Historic District
 Santee Coastal Reserve (part)
 Tom Yawkey Wildlife Center
 Wee Tee State Forest (part)

Major water bodies 
 Atlantic Ocean
 Black Mingo Swamp
 Black River
 Great Pee Dee River
 Intracoastal Waterway
 Little Pee Dee River
 Long Bay
 Murrells Inlet
 North Santee River
 Santee River
 South Santee River
 Waccamaw River
 Winyah Bay

Adjacent counties
 Horry County – northeast
 Marion County – north
 Williamsburg County – northwest
 Berkeley County – west
 Charleston County – southwest

Major highways

Major infrastructure 
 Georgetown Airport
 Port of Georgetown

Demographics

2020 census

As of the 2020 United States census, there were 63,404 people, 25,498 households, and 17,334 families residing in the county.

2010 census
As of the 2010 United States Census, there were 60,158 people, 24,524 households, and 17,282 families living in the county. The racial makeup of the county was 63.2% white, 33.6% black or African American, 0.5% Asian, 0.2% American Indian, 1.6% from other races, and 0.9% from two or more races. Those of Hispanic or Latino origin made up 3.1% of the population. In terms of ancestry, 13.5% were English, 9.0% were Irish, 8.7% were American, and 7.6% were German.

Of the 24,524 households, 29.1% had children under the age of 18 living with them, 50.8% were married couples living together, 15.6% had a female householder with no husband present, 29.5% were non-families, and 25.4% of all households were made up of individuals. The average household size was 2.43 and the average family size was 2.89. The median age was 45.4 years.

The median income for a household in the county was $42,666 and the median income for a family was $54,115. Males had a median income of $39,127 versus $28,390 for females. The per capita income for the county was $23,942. About 13.2% of families and 19.7% of the population were below the poverty line, including 32.3% of those under age 18 and 11.1% of those age 65 or over.

2000 census
As of the 2020 United States census, there were 55,797 people, 21,659 households, and 15,854 families living in the county. The population density was 68 people per square mile (26/km2). There were 28,282 housing units at an average density of 35 per square mile (13/km2). The racial makeup of the county was 59.69% White, 38.61% Black or African American, 0.14% Native American, 0.23% Asian, 0.03% Pacific Islander, 0.81% from other races, and 0.49% from two or more races. 1.65% of the population were Hispanic or Latino of any race.

There were 21,659 households, out of which 30.20% had children under the age of 18 living with them, 54.10% were married couples living together, 15.10% had a female householder with no husband present, and 26.80% were non-families. 23.30% of all households were made up of individuals, and 9.20% had someone living alone who was 65 years of age or older. The average household size was 2.55 and the average family size was 3.01.

In the county, the population was spread out, with 25.20% under the age of 18, 7.70% from 18 to 24, 25.90% from 25 to 44, 26.20% from 45 to 64, and 15.00% who were 65 years of age or older. The median age was 39 years. For every 100 females, there were 91.80 males. For every 100 females age 18 and over, there were 88.40 males.

The median income for a household in the county was $35,312, and the median income for a family was $41,554. Males had a median income of $31,110 versus $20,910 for females. The per capita income for the county was $19,805. About 13.40% of families and 17.10% of the population were below the poverty line, including 25.80% of those under age 18 and 14.00% of those age 65 or over.

Government and politics

Communities

City
 Georgetown (county seat)

Towns
 Andrews (partially in Williamsburg County)
 Pawleys Island

Census-designated place
 Murrells Inlet (largest community)
 Garden City (partially in Horry County)

Unincorporated communities
 Belle Isle
 DeBordieu
 Graves
 Hopewell (partially in Williamsburg County)
 Kensington
 Litchfield Beach
 Maryville
 North Santee
 Oatland
 Plantersville
 Pleasant Hill
 Prince George
 Sampit
 Sandy Island
 Spring Gully
 Yauhannah

See also 
 List of counties in South Carolina
 National Register of Historic Places listings in Georgetown County, South Carolina
 South Carolina State Parks
 List of South Carolina state forests
 National Wildlife Refuge

References

External links

 
 
 Georgetown County Tourism - The Hammock Coast
 Georgetown County History and Images

 
1769 establishments in South Carolina
Populated places established in 1769
Myrtle Beach metropolitan area